Matthew "Matt" Wearn  (born 30 September 1995) is an Australian competitive sailor, Olympic champion and multiple times medalist at world championships.

Wearn has been sailing since he was five years old. He chose the sport over a possible career in Australian Rules football. He was inspired by Beijing Olympic champions Elise Rechichi and Tessa Parkinson who came to his local sailing club in Perth to show young sailors the gold medals they had won in the 470 class.

Career
Wearn won silver medals at the Laser World Championships in 2018, 2019 and 2020. He qualified to represent Australia at the 2020 Summer Olympics in Tokyo 2021, winning the gold medal in Laser. He is currently engaged to the Belgian sailer Emma Plasschaert.

In the 2022 Australia Day Honours Wearn was awarded the Medal of the Order of Australia.

References

External links
 
 
 

1995 births
Living people
Australian male sailors (sport)
Olympic sailors of Australia
Olympic gold medalists for Australia
Olympic medalists in sailing
Sailors at the 2020 Summer Olympics – Laser
Medalists at the 2020 Summer Olympics
Recipients of the Medal of the Order of Australia
Sportsmen from Western Australia
21st-century Australian people